Chronoxenus rossi is a species of ant of the genus Chronoxenus. It was described by Donisthorpe in 1950.

References

Dolichoderinae
Insects of New Guinea
Insects described in 1950